Total: 507 km - narrow gauge of  (2008)
Railway companies in Jordan are:
 Hedjaz Jordan Railway: The only passenger railway currently operating in Jordan, connecting Amman to Damascus, in Syria, and passing through Zarqa and Mafraq. It is narrow gauge; the rest of the Syrian network uses .
 Aqaba Railway Corporation - phosphate to port of Aqaba

Plans 
The Jordanian government has begun acquiring land for new rail routes. Following a study by BNP Paribas, three routes are planned, which are expected to be tendered later in 2010. The three routes are:
 From the Syrian border, via Zarqa, to the Saudi border; replacing part of the Hedjaz Railway;
Connecting the first line to Aqaba, and from Mafraq to Irbid, replacing another part of the Hedjaz Railway;
A link to the Iraqi border.
However, in late 2010 the government announced an economic relief package and following the 2011 Jordanian protests it was decided to reduce the expected three year capital investment plan in the national railway network by 72 percent, partly to fund the relief package. Therefore, it is unclear when the ambitions railway expansion plan will be carried out.

There are also plans for a light rail system operating between Amman and Zarqa and metro line in Amman.

Currently, two connected but non-contiguously operated sections of the Hedjaz Railway exist:
 from Amman in Jordan to Syria, as the "Hedjaz Jordan Railway."
 from phosphate mines near Ma'an to the Gulf of Aqaba as the "Aqaba Railway."

In August 2011, Jordanian government approved the construction of the railway from Aqaba to the Iraqi border (near Trebil). The Iraqis in the meantime started the construction of the line from the border to their current railhead at Ramadi.

Timeline 
 2008- Proposals for international links.
 2007- China to rebuild Hejaz line
 2006- Various rail proposals.
 The Israeli business newspaper Globes reported that in a meeting between the Israeli minister of transport, Shaul Mofaz and the Jordanian ambassador in Tel Aviv in November, the transport minister announced that European nations are interested in financing the construction of a Haifa-Irbid-Amman railway.

 2005- 2005 in rail transport

  - Jordanian Transport Minister Saoud Nseirat responds to comments made on Monday, December 12, by Israeli Transport Minister Meir Shitrit. Shitrit had announced his intentions to propose a new standard gauge railway to connect Haifa, Israel, to Irbid, Jordan, passing through King Hussein Bridge and Jenin, a project that could cost as much as $300 million (for the Jordanian portion of the line). Nseirat responded to Shitrit's comments with a denial, stating that there have not been any discussions between the two nations on such a project and no plans for such a connection have been proposed by anyone in the Jordanian government. Shitrit plans to make his formal proposal at a conference for Mediterranean transport ministers in Marrakesh on December 20.

 - The Public Transport Regulatory Commission has entered into an agreement with a private sector consortium, following a competitive bidding process, to develop a light rail system between the Jordanian capital Amman and nearby industrial city of Zarqa. This light rail project, to be operational by 2011, will be the first urban rail public-private partnership (PPP) in the Middle East. The system will be operated using  (standard gauge) electrically propelled light rail vehicles on a double track. The total length of the LRS system will be approximately 25 kilometres. The majority of the LRS route, between Al-Mahatta (in Amman) and New Zarqa will be constructed within the existing Hedjaz Railway right-of-way (22.2 kilometres). The Public Transport Regulatory Commission estimates that the new system will carry about 45,000 passengers a day in its first year. Canada's CPCS was the lead advisor to the PTRC in this PPP transaction.
 CPCS is also advising the Government of Jordan in the privatization of the Aqaba Railway Corporation, running from Ma'an to Aqaba. This railway is used to transport phosphate from mines located in Ma'an. The commission plans to modernize the old  narrow gauge railway and replace it with new track.

See also
Transport in Jordan
Gulf Railway

References

Rail transport in Jordan